Henriettea granularis is a species of plant in the family Melastomataceae. It is endemic to Cuba.  It is threatened by habitat loss.

References

Endemic flora of Cuba
granularis
Critically endangered plants
Taxonomy articles created by Polbot